The surname Trojan may refer to:

 Aleksandra Trojan, Polish volleyball player
 Alexander Trojan (1914-1992), Austrian film actor
 Alois Pravoslav Trojan, Czech lawyer
 Ivan Trojan (born 1964), Czech actor
 Filip Trojan (born 1983) Czech footballer
 Kurt von Trojan (1937-2006),  Australian journalist and science fiction writer
 Ondřej Trojan (born 1959), Czech film producer, actor and film director
 Václav Trojan (1907–1983), Czech composer

See also
Troyan

Czech-language surnames